MyAir served the following destinations as of July 2009. The airline went bankrupt effective 24 July 2009.

Africa
Morocco
Casablanca – Mohammed V International Airport
Marrakech – Marrakech-Menara Airport

Europe
Austria
Vienna – Vienna International Airport
Belgium
Brussels – Brussels Airport
Bulgaria
Sofia – Sofia Airport
France
Paris
Paris-Charles de Gaulle Airport
Paris-Orly Airport
Greece
Athens – Athens International Airport
Italy
Bari – Bari Airport
Bergamo – Il Caravaggio International Airport (Base)
Bologna – Bologna Airport
Brindisi – Brindisi Airport
Cagliari – Cagliari Airport
Catania – Catania-Fontanarossa Airport
Foggia – Gino Lisa Airport
Genoa – Genoa Cristoforo Colombo Airport
Milan – Malpensa Airport
Naples – Naples Airport
Olbia – Olbia - Costa Smeralda Airport
Palermo – Palermo Airport
Reggio Calabria – Reggio Calabria Airport
Rimini – Federico Fellini Airport
Rome – Leonardo da Vinci Airport
Turin – Turin Airport
Venice – Marco Polo Airport (Base)
Netherlands
Amsterdam – Amsterdam Airport Schiphol
Romania
Bucharest – Aurel Vlaicu International Airport
Spain
Barcelona – Barcelona Airport
Ibiza – Ibiza Airport
Madrid – Barajas Airport
Switzerland
Geneva – Geneva Cointrin International Airport
Turkey
Istanbul – Istanbul Sabiha Gökçen International Airport

Former destinations
France – Bastia, Bordeaux, Lille, Marseilles, Metz
Romania – Timişoara
Spain – Ibiza

References

Lists of airline destinations